Sándor Kleckner (9 September 1885 – 27 January 1963) was a Hungarian rower. He competed in the men's eight event at the 1908 Summer Olympics.

References

1885 births
1963 deaths
Hungarian male rowers
Olympic rowers of Hungary
Rowers at the 1908 Summer Olympics
Place of birth missing